The 1974–75 season was the 73rd season in which Dundee competed at a Scottish national level, playing in Division One, where the club would finish in 6th place. Domestically, Dundee would also compete in both the Scottish League Cup and the Scottish Cup, where they would be eliminated in the group stage of the League Cup, and get knocked out by Celtic in semi-finals of the Scottish Cup for the third straight year. Dundee would also compete in the UEFA Cup, where they would be knocked out by R.W.D. Molenbeek in the 1st round.

Scottish Division One 

Statistics provided by Dee Archive.

League table

Scottish League Cup 

Statistics provided by Dee Archive.

Group 2

Group 2 table

Scottish Cup 

Statistics provided by Dee Archive.

UEFA Cup

Player statistics 
Statistics provided by Dee Archive

|}

See also 

 List of Dundee F.C. seasons

References

External links 

 1974-75 Dundee season on Fitbastats

Dundee F.C. seasons
Dundee